Marianne Blicher is a Danish director, visual artist and writer, currently based in Copenhagen. She started her career working as a stage manager in theater and as a producer in film. She is a graduate from Super16 film school in Denmark,  and holds a master's degree in communication from Roskilde University. Her short film "Belinda Beautiful" won several prizes worldwide, including a Silver Dragon for best fiction film at the Krakow Film Festival, and the award for best international fiction in the In the Palace ISFF, for Belinda Beautiful, in 2014.

References

External links
 

Living people
Danish women film directors
Date of birth missing (living people)
Year of birth missing (living people)